Dunc Gets Tweaked is the fourth novel in the Culpepper Adventures series by Gary Paulsen. It is about Dunc and Amos who are tracking down a stolen prototype skateboard. It was published on August 1, 1992 by Dell Publishing.

Novels by Gary Paulsen
1992 American novels